This is a list of people who have served as Lord Lieutenant of Queen's County.

There were lieutenants of counties in Ireland until the reign of James II, when they were renamed governors. The office of Lord Lieutenant was recreated on 23 August 1831. Appointments to the position ended with the creation of the Irish Free State in 1922.

Governors

 Charles Coote, 1st Earl of Mountrath: July–December 1661
 William Dawson, 1st Viscount Carlow: 1750–1779
 John Dawson, 1st Earl of Portarlington: –1774
 Charles Moore, 1st Marquess of Drogheda: 1774–1799; again in 1805
 William Wellesley-Pole, 1st Baron Maryborough: 1783–1831
 Charles Coote, 2nd Baron Castle Coote: –1823
 Thomas Cosby: –1831

Lord Lieutenants
 The Viscount de Vesci 17 October 1831 – 19 October 1855
 The Lord Castletown 17 November 1855 – 22 January 1883
 The Viscount de Vesci 28 March 1883 – December 1900
 Sir Algernon Coote, Bt 28 December 1900 – 22 October 1920
 Sir Hutcheson Poë, Bt 11 November 1920 – 1922

References

Queen's County